Nebrioporus elegans is a species of beetles in the family Dytiscidae. It is found in Europe.

See also 
 List of water beetle species recorded in Britain
 List of beetles of Ireland

References 

 Nebrioporus elegans at inpn.mnhn.fr

Dytiscidae
Beetles described in 1794